Attack may refer to:

Warfare and combat

 Offensive (military)
 Charge (warfare)
 Attack (fencing)
 Strike (attack)
 Attack (computing)
 Attack aircraft

Books and publishing
 The Attack (novel), a book
 Attack No. 1, comic and animation
 Attack! Books, a publisher 
 Attack! (publication), a tabloid publication of the National Alliance established in 1969. The name was changed to National Vanguard in 1978 
 Der Angriff, a.k.a. The Attack, a newspaper franchise
 In newspaper headlines, to save space, sometimes "criticise"

Films and television
 Attack! The Battle of New Britain a 1944 American armed forces documentary film
 Attack (1956 film), also known as Attack!, a 1956 American war film
 Attack (2016 film), a 2016 Telugu film
 Attack (2022 film), a 2022 Hindi film
 The Attack (1966 film), an Australian television play
 The Attack (2012 film), a 2012 film directed by Ziad Doueiri
 "The Attack" (Australian Playhouse)
 "The Attack", a season 7 episode of Lego Ninjago: Masters of Spinjitzu

Music 
 Attack Records, a record label
 Attack (music), the prefix or initial phase of a sound
 Attacca, the immediate joining of a musical movement to a previous one

Bands
 Attack (band), a 1980s band
 The Attack (band), a 1960s band
 Attack Attack!, a metalcore band

Albums 
 Attack!! (2002), an album by Yngwie J. Malmsteen
 The Attack (2007), an album by Jah Jah
 Attack Attack! (album), 2010
 Attack (AAA album), 2006
 Attack (Disciple album), 2014

Songs 
 "Attack!", by The Toys
 "Attack" (Thirty Seconds to Mars song), 2005
 "Attack", a song from the System of a Down album Hypnotize, 2005
 "Attack", a song from the Joe Satriani album Engines of Creation, 2000

Ships
 HMAS Attack (P 90), the lead ship of the Attack class patrol boats of the Royal Australian Navy 
 HMS Attack, three ships and a shore establishment of the Royal Navy
 Attack-class submarine, planned Royal Navy submarines, cancelled in 2012

Sports
 An alternative name for the offense
 The bowling attack in cricket

Other
 Attack! (board game), 2003
 ATTAC or Association pour la taxation des transactions financières et pour l'action citoyenne, activist organization 
 The Attack (video game), a 1981 game for the TI-99/4A computer
 Attack (political party), a political party in Bulgaria
 The Attack (painting), a 1899 painting by the Finnish artist Edvar Isto